Mansion Truss Bridge was a historic Camelback through truss bridge located near Mansion (now Altavista) in Campbell County, Virginia. It was built in 1903, and consisted of two camelback through trusses. It was elevated high above the Staunton River and took its name from the 18th century mansion of early settler John Ward.

It was demolished in 1999. It was listed on the National Register of Historic Places in 1978, and delisted in 2005.

See also
List of bridges documented by the Historic American Engineering Record in Virginia
List of bridges on the National Register of Historic Places in Virginia

References

External links

Historic American Engineering Record in Virginia
Road bridges in Virginia
Bridges completed in 1903
Buildings and structures in Campbell County, Virginia
Buildings and structures demolished in 1999
Parker truss bridges in the United States
Metal bridges in the United States